Béla Fleck & Abigail Washburn is the first album for Béla Fleck & Abigail Washburn as a duo. It won the 2016 Grammy for Best Folk Album.

Track listing

References 

2014 albums
Abigail Washburn albums
Béla Fleck albums
Rounder Records albums